The 1916 Texas Longhorns football team represented the University of Texas at Austin in the 1916 college football season.

During the A&M game the first Bevo was unveiled.

Schedule

References

Texas
Texas Longhorns football seasons
Southwest Conference football champion seasons
Texas Longhorns football